Poppy milk (aguonų pienas) is a traditional Lithuanian drink or soup, one of the 12-dish Christmas Eve supper Kūčios. Usually it is eaten together with kūčiukai, another traditional Lithuanian Christmas Eve dish. It is also an ingredient in kutya, a meal served during a traditional Ukrainian Christmas Eve feast. This drink is considered a dessert.

Preparation
To make poppy milk, one or two glasses of poppy seeds are needed. The poppy seeds are soaked in some hot water for a day or so, changing the water over time, until the seeds become soft. Then the poppy seeds are crushed in a food processor (or traditionally with a pestle in a mortar), until a white liquid comes out. Some cold water is added (preferably water that has been boiled, and cooled), and the poppy seeds are strained and  crushed once more.  This process is repeated several times in order to get a good poppy milk concentrate. Then, the poppy milk concentrate is diluted with some cold boiled water (the quantity of the water used, is a matter of taste, and certain family preferences, but the flavor of the poppy seeds should be pronounced). Finally, some sugar or honey is added to sweeten the poppy seed milk.

Additional usage 
Although traditionally served during the Christmas holiday, in modern times poppy milk has additional uses. It has been suggested as a sleep aid. There is limited information on poppy milk's effects, but studies on poppy seeds have shown promise.

Poppy milk has also been used as a milk substitute. Using poppy seed milk as a milk substitute is not a new application, but it is not frequently included in studies of milk alternatives.

References 

Lithuanian cuisine
Lithuanian drinks
Lithuanian traditions
Poppy seeds
Christmas food